Jacob William Melton (born September 7, 2000) is an American professional baseball outfielder in the Houston Astros organization. He played college baseball for the Oregon State Beavers.

Amateur career
Melton attended South Medford High School where he played baseball. In 2017, his junior season, he hit .453 with nine home runs. As a senior in 2018, he batted .513 with eight home runs and 33 stolen bases. He went undrafted in the 2018 Major League Baseball draft and enrolled at Linn-Benton Community College.

As a freshman at Linn-Benton in 2019, Melton batted .365 with three home runs, 39 RBIs, and 16 stolen bases over 39 games. That summer, he played in the Western Canadian Baseball League with the Okotoks Dawgs. He then transferred to Oregon State University to start the 2020 season. He appeared in seven games in which he batted .091 with six strikeouts over 11 at-bats before the season was cancelled due to the COVID-19 pandemic. Melton did not open the 2021 season in Oregon State's starting lineup, but eventually became their leadoff hitter, and appeared in 32 games (with 25 starts) before he injured his shoulder in late April, an injury which forced him to having season-ending shoulder surgery. Over those 32 games, he batted .404 with six home runs, 25 RBIs, and eight stolen bases. He returned healthy in 2022 as Oregon State's starting center fielder. Over 63 games played during the season, Melton slashed .360/.424/.671 with 17 home runs, 83 RBIs, 22 doubles, and 21 stolen bases. He was named the Pac-12 Conference Baseball Player of the Year.

Professional career
The Houston Astros selected Melton in the second round with the 64th overall selection of the 2022 Major League Baseball draft. He signed with the team for $1 million.

Melton made his professional debut with the Florida Complex League Astros and was promoted to the Fayetteville Woodpeckers after four games. Over 23 games between both teams, he batted .261 with four home runs and 13 RBIs.

References

External links
Oregon State Beavers bio

2000 births
Living people
Baseball players from Oregon
Baseball outfielders
Oregon State Beavers baseball players
All-American college baseball players
Fayetteville Woodpeckers players